From Here to Eternity is a 1953 film.

From Here to Eternity may also refer to:

From Here to Eternity (novel), a 1951 novel by James Jones; basis for the 1953 film
From Here to Eternity the Musical, a 2013 musical by Tim Rice based on the novel
From Here to Eternity (miniseries), a 1979 TV miniseries
From Here to Eternity (TV series), a 1980 TV series based on the novel
"From Here to Eternity", an episode of the TV series The Best Years
"From Here to Eternity", an episode of the anime television series RahXephon
From Here to Eternity: Traveling the World to Find the Good Death, a 2017 book by Caitlin Doughty

Music 
From Here to Eternity (Giorgio Moroder album), 1977
"From Here to Eternity" (Giorgio Moroder song), 1977
From Here to Eternity: Live, a 1999 album by The Clash
From Here to Eternity (Envy album), 1998
"From Here to Eternity" (Iron Maiden song), 1992
"From Here to Eternity" (Michael Peterson song), 1998
"From Here to Eternity" (1953 song), a song recorded by Frank Sinatra

See also
From Here to Eternally, a 1979 Spinners album
From Her to Eternity, a 1984 album by Nick Cave & the Bad Seeds
From There to Eternity or The First Ten Years: The Videos, a DVD by Iron Maiden
"From Where to Eternity", episode 22 of The Sopranos
From Fear to Eternity (disambiguation)